TSY may refer to:

Tasikmalaya Airport (IATA airport code TSY), Tasikmalaya, West Java, Indonesia
Tsing Yi station (MTR station code TSY), Hong Kong